Jessica Hilzinger (born 26 May 1997 in Grabs, Switzerland) is a German alpine ski racer.

World Championship results

References

External links

1997 births
Living people
German female alpine skiers
Sportspeople from the canton of St. Gallen
21st-century German women